Johann Jakob Quandt (27 March 1686 in Königsberg – 17 January 1772 in Königsberg) was a German orthodox Lutheran theologian, and professor of theology in Königsberg. He opposed Pietism, but sympathized with Wolffianism. He is known for sponsoring the first complete translation of the Bible into Lithuanian, the Quandt Bible of 1735. He was also a librarian of the Königsberg Public Library (first librarian, 1714–18).

He was considered an excellent preacher. Frederick the Great called him the best preacher he knew. In 1743 he published a hymnal in response to Georg Friedrich Rogall's Pietist hymnal.

References

1686 births
1772 deaths
German librarians
German Lutheran theologians
18th-century German Protestant theologians
University of Königsberg alumni
Academic staff of the University of Königsberg
People from the Duchy of Prussia
German male non-fiction writers
18th-century German male writers
18th-century translators
Clergy from Königsberg